Brachyplatystoma capapretum, the dark caped goliath catfish, also called Peru piraiba catfish or false piraiba, is a species of catfish of the family Pimelodidae that is native to watershed areas of Brazil and Peru.

Distribution
It is a much widespread species that is found in large tributary rivers and lakes including Amazon River from Belém, Brazil upriver to at least Iquitos, Peru throughout Trombetas, Madeira, Negro, Manacapuru, Purus, Tefé, Juruá, Jutaí, and Içá.

Description
It grows to a length of 1010 mm. Adults show strange counter shading with dark grayish dorsum and plain white to dusky cream ventrum. Caudal fin moderately to shallowly forked. Juvenile with bold, large dark brown or gray spots centred above lateral line.

It is entirely piscivorous.

Ecology
It is found in both freshwater benthopelagic fish commonly inhabits muddy waters and deeper, flowing channels. Juveniles and sub adults are migratory.

References

Pimelodidae
Catfish of South America
Freshwater fish of Brazil
Taxa named by John Graham Lundberg
Taxa named by Alberto Akama
Fish described in 2005